Karina Friborg Due (born 23 November 1966 in Herning) is a Danish politician, who was a member of the Folketing for the Danish People's Party from 2015 to 2019.

Political career
From 2010 to 2015 Due was a member of the municipal council of Silkeborg Municipality and has also been a member of the regional council of the Central Denmark Region. She was elected into parliament in the 2015 Danish general election. She ran again in the 2019 election, but was not reelected.

References

External links 
 Biography on the website of the Danish Parliament (Folketinget)

Living people
1966 births
People from Herning Municipality
Danish People's Party politicians
Danish municipal councillors
21st-century Danish women politicians
Women members of the Folketing
Members of the Folketing 2015–2019